D’Antonio or d'Antonio is a surname of Italian origin. It derived from the Antonius root name. Notable people with the surname include:

Biagio d'Antonio (1446–1516), Italian Renaissance painter
Gino D'Antonio (1927–2006), Italian comic writer and artist
Michael D'Antonio (born 1955), American author and journalist
Mike D'Antonio (contemporary), American metalcore musician
Nunziata d'Antonio (1468–1525), Florentine artist
Trent D'Antonio (born 1985), Australian professional baseball player
Antonio di Nunziato d'Antonio, birthname of Anthony Toto, (1498–1554), Italian painter and architect

See also
D'Antoni, Italian surname
Dantonio, Italian surname
di Antonio, Italian surname
Emile de Antonio

References

Italian-language surnames
Patronymic surnames
Surnames from given names